orlan is an internationally recognized French artist. 
She is not tied to any one material, technology, or artistic practice. She uses sculpture, photography, performance, video, 3D, video games, augmented reality, artificial intelligence, and robotics (she has created a robot in her image that speaks with her voice) as well as scientific and medical techniques such as surgery and biotechnology... to question the social phenomena of our time. 
She says that her art is not body art, but rather 'carnal art,' which lacks the suffering aspect of body art.

Biography

Born in 1947, ORLAN is an artist who expresses herself through different media: painting, sculpture, installations, performance, photography, digital images, artificial intelligence, robotics, augmented reality, biotechnologies... She says that her art is not body art, but rather 'carnal art,' which lacks the suffering aspect of body art.

Since the 1960s and the 1970s, ORLAN has questioned the status of the body and the political, religious, social, and traditional pressures that are inscribed in it. Her work denounces the violence done to the body and in particular to women's bodies, and thus engages in a feminist struggle. She makes her body the privileged instrument where our own relationship to otherness is played out. This work of ORLAN on the body is done in particular by the means of photography.

In 1976, for example, she walked the streets wearing a dress on which her naked body was represented. In the same period, in Portugal, she offered photos glued to wood and cut out corresponding to pieces of herself: an arm, a piece of breast, etc.

In 1977, Orlan performed Kiss of the artist (Baiser de l'artiste), during the International Fair of Contemporary Art (FIAC ), in the Grand Palais in Paris. Orlan displayed a life-size photograph of her own nude torso, which she sat behind. The life-sized photograph was turned into a slot machine. A spectator would insert a coin and could see it descending to the groin before being awarded a kiss from the artist herself. The installation created a scandal that cost the artist her teaching position.

In 1978, she created the International Symposium of the Performance in Lyon, which she animated until 1982.

Her manifesto of "carnal art" (Manifeste de l'Art Charnel) is followed by a series of surgical operations- performances that she carries out between 1990 and 1993. With this series, the body of the artist becomes a place of public debate. These surgical operations - performances were widely publicized and provoked a strong polemic, although they represent only a tiny part of her integral work.

ORLAN also explores the use of new technologies in the arts.

In 1982, with Frédéric Develay, she created the first online magazine of contemporary art, Art-Accès-Revue, on Minitel. 
This magazine invites international artists working in situ and/or with conceptual problems to create original works specially conceived on Minitel, by Minitel, and for Minitel. Many of the works play with the Videotex graphic style or ironically imitate Minitel services (Bernar Venet, Vera Molnár, Ben, François Morellet, Daniel Buren...)
The works are accompanied by critical essays. The service also regularly gives the floor to the public. A public presentation of this database took place at the Centre Pompidou during the exhibition Les Immatériaux by Jean-François Lyotard. The Art-Acess service has been distributed free of charge by the city of Metz server: MIRABEL.

In her work of the late 1990s and early 2000s, "Self-Hybridations", the artist, through digital photography and computer graphics editing software, hybridizes faces from different cultures (Native American, pre-Columbian, African).

ORLAN then attempted to further expand the boundaries of contemporary art by using biotechnology to create an installation entitled Harlequin Coat made from the artist's own cells and cells of human and animal origin.

At the same time, ORLAN taught at the École nationale supérieure d'arts de Paris-Cergy. 
In 2005, she was awarded a one-year residency at the ISCP in New York by l'Association française d'action artistique (AFAA), and in 2006 she was invited to Los Angeles for a residency at the Getty Research Institute, the Getty Center's research laboratory.

In June 2013, she filed a complaint against Lady Gaga for plagiarism. For ORLAN, the American star, in the album Born This Way released in 2011, was too freely inspired by her "hybridizations". In addition, the beginning of the video clip of the homonymous song shows Lady Gaga made up and decapitated recalling her "Woman with head" executed in 1996. The artist sought $31.7 million in compensation. The plea hearing had been set for July 7, 2016, at the Paris high court. A first verdict was announced in the disadvantage of ORLAN, who then had to pay 20,000 euros to the singer, but the artist decided to appeal. In May 2018, the Paris Court of Appeal dismissed ORLAN by confirming the absence of the parasitic nature of the video clip incriminated. ORLAN was ordered to pay 10,000 euros, as costs incurred, to Lady Gaga.

She received the Grand Prix de le-Réputation 2013, organized by Alexia Guggemos in the visual arts category, which rewards the most popular personalities on the internet, alongside Philippe Starck and Yann Arthus-Bertrand

Since October 18, 2018, ORLAN is represented in France by the Ceysson & Bénétière Gallery in Paris.

In 2019, she was a member of the jury of the Opline Prize, the first online contemporary art prize.

During the lockdown linked to the COVID-19 pandemic, she wrote her autobiography, '"Strip-Tease : tout sur ma vie, tout sur mon art" published by Gallimard in the collection Témoins de l'Art.

On November 29, 2021, she was decorated with the National Order of the Legion of Honor to the rank of Knight by the Minister of Culture Roselyne Bachelot.

The Reincarnation of Sainte-ORLAN

In 1990, Orlan began The Reincarnation of Sainte-ORLAN.  It involved a series of plastic surgeries through which the artist transformed herself into elements from famous paintings and sculptures of women. As a part of her "Carnal Art" manifesto, these works were filmed and broadcast in institutions throughout the world, such as the Centre Georges Pompidou in Paris and the Sandra Gehring Gallery in New York.

Orlan picked these characters, "not for the canons of beauty they represent... but rather on account of the stories associated with them."
Orlan defines cosmetic surgery as "nomadic, mutant, shifting, differing." Orlan has stated, "my work is a struggle against the innate, the inexorable, the programmed, Nature, DNA (which is our direct rival as far as artists of representation are concerned), and God!". In an interview with Acne Paper, Orlan stated:I can observe my own body cut open, without suffering!... I see myself all the way down to my entrails; a new mirror stage... I can see to the heart of my lover; his splendid design has nothing to do with sickly sentimentalities... Darling, I love your spleen; I love your liver; I adore your pancreas, and the line of your femur excites me." (from Carnal Art manifesto)

"Sainte ORLAN" came from a character that I created for "Le baiser de l'artiste" from a text called "Facing a society of mothers and merchants." The first line of this text was: "At the bottom of the cross were two women, Maria and Maria Magdalena." These are two inevitable stereotypes of women that are hard to avoid: the mother and the prostitute. In "Le baiser de l'artiste" there were two faces. One was Saint ORLAN, a cutout picture of me dressed as Madonna glued onto wood. One could buy a five francs church candle and I was sitting on the other side behind the mock-up of the vending machine. One could buy a French kiss from me for the same amount of money one could buy a candle. The idea was to play on the ambivalence of the woman figure and the desire of both men and women towards those biblical and social stereotypes.
Being showcased in the Paris International Contemporary Art Fair.

In the 2000s 
In 2001, Orlan orchestrated a series of filmic posters, "Le Plan du Film," with various artists and writers.
She collaborated in 2008 with the Symbiotica laboratory in Australia, resulting in the bio-art installation "The Harlequin's Coat."Part of Orlan's ongoing work includes "Suture/Hybridize/Recycle," a generative and collaborative series of clothing made from Orlan's wardrobe and focusing on suture: the deconstruction of past clothing reconstructed into new clothing that highlights the sutures.

In June 2013, she filed a complaint against Lady Gaga. For Orlan, the American star, in the album Born This Way released in 2011 is inspired by the artist without quoting her. The beginning of the video clip of the homonymous song shows Lady Gaga with implants similar to those of Orlan and the face of Lady Gaga beheaded recalls the work Woman with head created in 1996. Her lawyer was asking for compensation of 31.7 million dollars. The hearing was set for July 7, 2016, at the Tribunal de la Grande Instance de Paris. A first verdict was announced against Orlan but the artist decided to appeal. In May 2018, the Court of Appeal of Paris rejected Orlan by confirming the absence of the parasitic nature of the video clip.

It receives the Reputation on line Prize (Grand Prix de le-réputation) in 2013, organized by the art critic Alexia Guggemos, Plastic Arts category, which rewards the most popular personalities on the Internet alongside Phillipe Starck for design and Yann Arthus-Bertrand for photography.

In 2018, Orlan created a robot in her own image, "ORLANoïde", equipped with collective and social artificial intelligence that speaks with her voice by reading texts from a text generator: presented at the Grand Palais, for the exhibition "Artists and Robots", the robot is also part of a performance entitled "Electronic and verbal striptease" and also benefits from a motion generator. It is a work in progress, currently, the developers of the Art and science gallery in Dublin are developing other capacities.

In 2019, she was honored with the special prize of WOMAN OF THE YEAR, awarded by the Prince of Monte Carlo.
Orlan is also appointed Professor Emeritus of the Accademia di Belle Arti di Roma.

During the confinement in 2020, Orlan wrote her autobiography Strip-tease : tout sur ma vie, tout sur mon art published by Gallimard on the 3rd of June, 2021.

On November 29, 2021, she was decorated with the National Order of the Legion of Honor with the rank of Knight by the Minister of Culture Roselyne Bachelot

She is represented in France by the Ceysson & Bénétière Gallery.

Works

Recent works 
ORLAN et l'ORLANoïde strip-tease artistique électronique et verbal,2018, Exhibition Artistes et robots, Grand Palais, Paris, France: a humanoid in the image of Orlan (but exposing its mechanical armature) sings or speaks using her voice, dances, using information gathered collectively and in conjunction with deep learning algorithms
Tangible Striptease en Nanoséquences, 2016, Centre des Arts, Enghien-les-Bains and Université Paris Diderot, Paris, France : Orlan, in collaboration with Mael Le Mée, created a performance in which the ORLAN-corps, in the form of biological samples and cultures of its microbiota, circulated among the spectators
Expérimentale mise en jeu, 2015: video game in which the viewer, by means of MYOS bracelets, controls an avatar of the artist. The aim of the character is to restore works that have been destroyed, with each progression in the restoration, the central character builds his humanity and finally, the ruined landscape is rebuilt. This game is based on the idea that "killing is not playing"
Self-hybridations Masques de l'Opéra de Pékin, Facing Design et réalité augmentée, 2014 : the artist's most recent series of self-hybridizations in which she hybridizes her face with typical Pekin Opera masks. This interactive photographic series uses augmented reality. The viewer, by scanning the work as a QR code, sees appear on his screen an avatar of ORLAN performing acrobatics of the Pekin Opera, he can then photograph himself or other spectators with the avatar share and share his pictures online
La liberté en écorchée, 2013 : this 3D video shows the artist's body modeled in 3D. It is a manifesto insisting both on the "flayed" nature of artists and on his responsibility concerning this notion of freedom to be constantly defended. 
Robes sans corps, Sculptures de plis, 2010: sculptures of drapery without body, in gold leaf resin or platinum
Le Slow de l'artiste, 2021

Emblematic works 
Among the most emblematic works of her career we can mention : 
Orlan accouche d'elle-m'aime, 1964: in this black and with photography, ORLAN gives birth to a character like an inert and androgynous body, neither man nor woman. This work symbolizes the artist's desire to give birth to herself, to invent a new identity. This series is part of the Corps-sculptures. It is created a few months after an abortion of the artist. 
MesuRages (1974-2011): the name chosen for this series of actions insists on the word "Rage" since the artist refuses to play the role that one wants to impose on her. Using the "Orlan-body", a new unit of measurement, the artist will measure St. Peter's Square in Rome, Chateaubriand Street in Nice, the Georges Pompidou Center in Paris, the St. Peter's Museum in Lyon, the Andy Warhol Museum in Pittsburgh, the Museum of Contemporary Art in Antwerp and the Guggenheim Museum in New-York. On the Place Saint-Lambert in Liège, ORLAN's "MesuRage" takes on a political character, since the artist was invited by an association campaigning for the defense of this square, which is threatened by an urban planning operation. 
Le Baiser de l'artiste: a 1977 performance at the Grand Palais, where the International Contemporary Art Fair was taking place. Seated behind life-size photography of her naked bust, treated like an ATM, ORLAN calls out to the public: "Come closer, come to my pedestal, that of the myths: the mother, the whore, the artist" . On a black platform, she monetizes her kisses, while to her right another photographic silhouette pasted on wood shows her as a Virgin to whom one can, for the same price, offer a candle. This action caused a great scandal and was highly publicized. This work was exhibited in 2008 in the exhibition WACK! Art and the Feminist Revolution at the National Museum of Women in the Arts in Washington D.C, the Vancouver Art Gallery, MOCA Gefen in Los Angeles, and the P.S 1 Contemporary Art Center in New York. 
Le Drapé-le Baroque (1979-1986): this series of photographs constitutes a complex and rather suggestive iconography on the spiritual level, with characters inspired by Christian iconographies, such as Saint ORLAN, the white virgin, and the black virgin. These works are a continuation of ORLAN's quest for female identity, her critique of religious pressures and her staging of the Baroque. 
L’Origine de la guerre: in 1989, is a counterpart to Gustave Courbet's famous painting, The Origin of the World. A phallus spread legs with head, arms, and legs cut off, taking up and "transvestising" Courbet's feminine iconography, illustrates the title in a gesture that does not detract from feminism. 
La Réincarnation de sainte Orlan: begun in 1990, or Images / Nouvelles Images, comprises a serie of nine cosmetic surgery. Operations/performances, during which ORLAN makes her flesh the material of her work and takes as its basis the representations of women in Western art. Each of ORLAN's carefully planned and executed. Operations/performances are staged and controlled by the artist. Through these interventions, she "put the figure on her face". She chooses the literalness of the performance to speak about the violence done to the body, in particular to the women's body, and to question the models of beauty because ORLAN had implants usually put to raise the cheekbones on each side of the forehead, which creates two bumps on the temples. 
Omniprésence(November 1993): ORLAN meets Dr. Marjorie Cramer in New York, a surgeon who accepts the artistic and feminist objectives of her project: the radical transformation of her face by implants in the temples. The objective is to divert plastic surgery from its usual objectives and to question the standards of beauty. This operation/performance is broadcast live in her exhibition at the Sandra Gering Gallery in New York, at the Centre Georges Pompidou in Paris, at the Mac Luhan Center in Toronto, at the Banff Multimedia Center, and on CNN. 
Ceci est mon corps…Ceci est mon logiciel… is a performance conference on May 30, 1990, accompanied by a book and a CD-Rom. She develops there the Manifesto of the carnal art (Manifeste de l'art charnel) 
Le plan du film (2001): following the example of Jean-Luc Godard, who spoke of the production of a "film in reverse", ORLAN starts from the creation of cinema posters to then define the casting, the script, a promotional evening at the Fondation Cartier for contemporary art, a soundtrack by the group Tanger, the trailer of the film, the producer. She exhibited all of this work at the Cannes Film Festival in 2002 at the Hôtel Martinez. 
Self-hybridizations(1998-2002): digital images featuring the artist in physical metamorphoses (virtual this time) questioning the canons of beauty of other civilizations (Amerindian, pre-Columbian and African). Using computer processes, ORLAN transforms her image in a way that brings her closer to pre-Columbian (such as the deformation of the Mayan skull), African, Egyptian, Amerindian, and Merovingian cultural traditions. This work is in the continuity of her previous works where she denounced the social pressures that our society inflicts on the body and appearance. Here she stages the absurdity of these criteria, which are opposed according to the time or the civilization in which one lives. The image of the ideal body becomes completely abstract and ironic. 
Le Manteau d'Arlequin: it is an installation mixing art and biotechnologies, created with living cells of ORLAN, cells of different origins, and even animal cells. This work is inspired by Michel Serres' text,  Laïcité, placed as a preface to his book Le Tiers Instruit. Michel Serres uses the figure of the Harlequin as a metaphor for crossing, accepting the other, conjunction, intersection.  Le Manteau d'Arlequin develops and continues to explore the idea of crossing using the more carnal medium of skin. It also questions the relationship between biotechnology and artistic culture. This installation has been presented in Perth, Liverpool, Luxembourg. 
Her ultimate work would be to place her mummified body in a museum, but it seems that the artist has not yet found a public collection to display this work.

ORLAN's works can be found in the collections of various museums, including the Musée National d'Art Moderne, Maison européenne de la photographie, Fonds nation d'art contemporain, the Los Angeles County Museum of Art, the Getty Center, the National Museum of Art, Osaka, the Museum of Modern Art, as well as various private collections, including the François Pinault Collection.

Bibliography

Monographs 
2019
 Yann Toma (dir.), ORLAN, "Les femmes qui pleurent sont en colère", par femme avec tête(s), Paris, Sorbonne Artgallery, éditions Jannink
 Ceysson B., Chauvel-Lévy L., Hill E., ORLAN avant ORLAN, Ceysson éditions d'Art

2018
 Devilliers Laurence, Kyrou Ariel, ORLAN, Martin V., ORLAN-oïde robot hybride avec intelligence artificielle et collective, Éditions Lienart

2017
 Neutres J., Rice S., Franck T., Monterosso J.-L., ORLAN EN CAPITALES, Éditions SKIRA Acquaviva F., ORLAN Exogène, Éditions AcquAvivA

2016
 Park Moon Soon, Soukyoun L., Jinsang Y., Grau D., Piguet P., Prieto I., Quaranta D., ORLAN TechnoBody Retrospective, 1966-2016, Éditions Scala

2015
 Grau D., Meyer J.-R., Piguet P., Prieto I., Quaranta D., ORLAN, Striptease des cellules jusqu'à l'os, Éditions Scala, Paris
 ORLAN, Zoom baroque : Plis et déplis, Galleria Peccolo

2014
 Baranovska I., Grenier C., Païni D., Rehm J.-P., ORLAN, L'art de la reine des masques, Gallery Michel Rein, Paris
 ORLAN, The Icon of the French Contemporary Art, House Neputns, Riga, Latvia
 ORLAN, L'art de la reine des masques, Galerie Michel Rein, Paris, Gallery Sejul, Séoul

2013
 Benito Climent J. I., El Arte-Carnal En ORLAN, Hacia Una Estética Del Sacrificio, Devenir, Madrid
ORLAN, L'origine de la Guerre, Musée D'Orsay, Paris

2012
 Bourriaud N., La Chance M. et Acos Palma R., ORLAN Arte Carnal o cuerpo obsoleto / hibridaciones y refigurationes, Museum de Antioquia, Medellin, Museum of Modern Art, Bogota Colombia, Baere Bart de, Gregoir S., Van Mulders W., Besacier H., Charre A., ORLAN MesuRAGES (1968-2012)
 Action: ORLAN-body, Éditions du M HKA, Anvers
 Morelli A., Muyle J., Rollin P.-O., Est-ce que vous êtes Belge ? ORLAN, Yellow Now/ENSAV La Cambre, Bruxelles

2011
 Morineau C., Chavanne B. et Buci-Glucksmann C., Un bœuf sur la langue ORLAN, Éditions Fage, Lyon
 Bonnafous-Boucher M., Ed Al Dante Aka; Ceci est mon corps. . . ceci est mon logiciel, coll. Cahiers du Midi – coll. de l'Académie royale des beaux- arts de Bruxelles, Bruxelles

2010
 Bhabha H. K., Garelick R. K., Serres M., Tejeda I., Veneciano J. D., Virilio P. et Vu L., Faboulous Harlequin, ORLAN and the patchwork self

2009
 ORLAN, Virilio P., Transgression, transfiguration [conversation], L'Une et L'Autre, Paris

2008
 Cruz Sanchez P. A., De la Villa R., Garelick R., Serres M., Tejeda I., Vu L., ORLAN + davidelfi n, SUTURE-HYBRIDISATION-RECYCLING, held at Espacio Artes Visuales, Éditions E. A. V., Murcia
 Stefanutti C., Tra identità e alterità del proprio corpo-ORLAN, Tecnograf

2007
 Bader J., Hegyi L., Kuspit D., Iacub M., Phelan P., Viola E., ORLAN, The Narrative, Charta, Milan
 Barjou N., Defl andre L., Dubrulle, University of Nebraska (Received the First Price "Museum Publication Design" from the American Association Museums for 2011), University of Nebraska, USA
 Bouchard G., Buci-Glucksmann C., Caygill H., Donger S., Gilman Sander L., Hallensle-ben M., Hauser J., Johnson D., Malysse S., Olbrist H. U., ORLAN, Petitgas C., Shepherd S., Virilio P., Wiln son S., ORLAN, A Hybrid Body of Artworks, Routledge, Londres Enthoven R., ORLAN, Vaneigem R., Unions Libres, Mariages Mixtes et Noces Barbares, Éditions Dilecta, Paris, 2010
 Gautheron M., Laot C., Marquis C., Noesser C., Normand O., ORLAN, Morceaux choisis, École nationale supérieure/Musée d'Art Moderne de Saint-Étienne Métropole, Lyon

2005
 O'Bryan J., Carnal Art. ORLAN's Refacing, University of Minnesota Press

2004
 Blistène B., Buci-Glucksmann C., Cros C., Durand R., Heartney E., Le Bon L., Obrist H. U., ORLAN, Rehberg Zugazagoitia J., ORLAN (angl. : ORLAN, Carnal Art), Flammarion, Paris

Books 
 Strip-tease : tout sur ma vie, tout sur mon art, ORLAN, Ed. Gallimard, Collections Témoins de l'art
 Ceci est mon corps. . . ceci est mon logiciel, postface by Maria Bonnafous-Boucher, Ed Al Dante Aka, Collection Cahiers du Midi - Collection de l'Académie royale des beaux- arts de Bruxelles, Bruxelles, 2011
 Unions mixtes, mariages libres et noces barbares, with Raphaël Enthoven and Raoul Vaneigem; Dilecta, collection « Collectionneur », 2010.
 Pomme Cul et petites fleurs, éditions Baudoin Janninck, Paris, France, 2007
 ORLAN, Alliance Française, Buenos Aires, Argentine, 1999
 Une oeuvre d'ORLAN, Muntaner, Marseille, 1998
 "Viva !" in 1979-1983, Cinq ans d'Art Performance à Lyon, Editions comportement, environnement, performance, Lyon, France, 1984
 Prosésies écrites, prefaces by Henri Simon Faure & Lell Boehm, illustrations by J. M. P., Ed imprimerie Lithographique Peagno, St-Etienne, France, 1967

Notes

References 
 Smith, K. (2007). Abject Bodies Beckett, Orlan, Stelarc and the politics of contemporary performance. Performance Research, 12(1), 66–76.
 Zerihan, R. (2012). ORLAN: A Hybrid Body of Artworks. Contemporary Theatre Review, 22(3), 426–428.
 Ayers, R. (1999). Serene and Happy and Distant: An Interview with Orlan. Body & Society, 5(2/3), 171.
 Knafo, D. (2009). Castration and Medusa: Orlan's Art on the Cutting Edge. Studies in Gender & Sexuality, 10(3), 142–158.
 Lovelace, C. (1995). Orlan: Offensive Acts. Performing Arts Journal, 17(1), 13–25. doi:10.2307/3245692 Orlan: Offensive Acts
 Rose, B. (1993). Is it art? Orlan and the transgressive act. Art in America, 81(2), 82. 
 Sayej, N. (2020, March 26). ORLAN: "I walked a long way for women." The Guardian. ORLAN: 'I walked a long way for women'

External links
 
 
 Retrospective Exhibition from 05/25/07 to 09/16/07 at the Musée d'art moderne de Saint-Etienne
 Pompidou Centre, exhibition: elles@centrepompidou 2010.
 Video: interview with ORLAN, registration of a MesuRage, and short overview of her work at M HKA, Antwerp

1947 births
Living people
20th-century French women artists
BioArtists
Body art
French contemporary artists
French mixed-media artists
New media artists
People known for their body modification
Artists from Saint-Étienne